Jean-Pierre Limosin (born 1949) is a French film director and screenwriter. He has directed seven films since 1983. His film Tokyo Eyes was screened in the Un Certain Regard section at the 1998 Cannes Film Festival.

Filmography
 Faux fuyants (1983)
 Gardien de la nuit (1986)
 L'autre nuit (1988)
 Tokyo Eyes (1998)
 Novo (2002)
 Carmen (2005)
 Young Yakuza (2007)

References

External links

1949 births
Living people
French film directors
French male screenwriters
French screenwriters